Beldanga Assembly constituency is an assembly constituency in Murshidabad district in the Indian state of West Bengal.

Overview
As per orders of the Delimitation Commission, No. 71 Beldanga Assembly constituency covers Beldanga municipality, Bhabta I, Bhabta II, Debkundu, Mirjapur II, Mahula I and Sujapur Kumarpur gram panchayats of Beldanga I community development block, and Bhakuri II, Haridasmati, Naoda Panur, Rajdharpara and Rangamati Chandpara gram panchayats of Berhampore community development block.

Beldanga Assembly constituency is part of No. 10 Baharampur (Lok Sabha constituency).

Members of Legislative Assembly

Election results

2016
In the 2016 election, Sk. Shafiujjaman of Congress defeated his nearest rival Golam Kibria Mia of Trinamool Congress.

2011
In the 2011 election, Sk. Shafiujjaman of Congress defeated his nearest rival Md. Refatullah of RSP.

1977–2006
In the 2006 state assembly elections Md. Refatullah of RSP won the Beldanga assembly seat defeating his nearest rival Golam Kibria Mia of Congress. Contests in most years were multi cornered but only winners and runners are being mentioned. Golam Kibria Mia of Congress defeated Timir Baran Bhaduri of RSP in 2001. Timir Baran Bhaduri of RSP defeated Nurul Islam Choudhury of Congress in 1996. Nurul Islam Choudhury of Congress defeated Sk. Nowshad Ali of RSP in 1991 and 1987, and Timir Baran Bhaduri of RSP in 1982. Timir Baran Bhaduri of RSP defeated Nurul Islam Choudhury of Congress in 1977.

1951–1972
Timir Baran Bhaduri of RSP won in 1972 and 1971. Muhammed Khuda Baksh, Independent, won in 1969. A. Latif of Congress won in 1967. Debsaran Ghosh of RSP won in 1962. Parimal Ghosh of Congress won from the Beldanga seat in 1957 and in independent India's first election in 1951.

References

Assembly constituencies of West Bengal
Politics of Murshidabad district